Annette Vollmer Heick (born 12 November 1971) is a Danish television personality, journalist, singer and cartoon voice actress. She is the daughter of the entertainers Keld and Hilda Heick.

Career 
Her journalistic career started in 1987, where she was employed by BT. Following this, she has been employed by Se og Hør and Ekstra Bladet.

As a singer, she and Tommy Seebach had a big hit in 1987 with Du skælder mig hele tiden ud. In October 2005, her debut solo album, Right Time, was released.

She has worked as a television presenter on DR, TV 2, TV Danmark.

In her career as a voice actress, she has provided the Danish voices to numerous cartoon characters, including Daisy Duck in House of Mouse, Douglas in Lloyd in Space, Princess Atta in Pixar's movie A Bug's Life, Shego in Kim Possible and Sandy Cheeks in SpongeBob SquarePants.

Annette Heick did also play Glinda in Det Ny Teater's production of Wicked (musical) in 2010/11 alongside Maria Lucia Rosenberg as Elphaba. In 2020, Annette played Donna Sheridan (Danish: Donna Svendsen) in the revival of Mamma Mia (musical) in Tivoli's concert hall.

References

External links 
 

1971 births
Living people
Danish voice actresses
Danish women journalists
20th-century Danish journalists
21st-century Danish journalists
Ekstra Bladet people